I'll Be Seeing You, also known as Mary Higgins Clark's I'll Be Seeing You, is a 2004 television film based on the novel by Mary Higgins Clark starring Alison Eastwood and Mark Humphrey.

Story

Patricia Collins is asked to identify the body of a young woman who looks exactly like her.  During her search to find out more information about her double, she investigates her father's mysterious disappearance.  The closer she gets to the answers, the more dangerous her situation becomes.

Patricia Collins, a young woman who resembles a local, is assassinated by a stalker (Bernie) as she was walking down the street. Bernie turns out to be a man who works in the same office building where Patricia Collins' father previously worked and vanished. Bernie kills the young woman, Annie, after asking her if she needs a ride and she declines, he thinks it's Patricia ignoring him. He continues to stalk Patricia with a video camera, even entering her house several times without her seeing him.

To save the ranch Patricia and her mother live on the two seek the life insurance money from Burton Collins (Patricia's Father) under the assumption he is dead after being gone for nine months.  The insurance company denies their claim based on the fact there is no proof Mr. Collins is dead and he had withdrawn $200,000 from his savings account before he died.  Patricia goes to the business her father and a partner, Phillip Martin, own and begins asking questions about her father.  Mr. Martins asks Patricia to accompany him to an office party for a retiring doctor at a fertility clinic which was a client of her father.  There she meets Elaine Petravick who becomes uncomfortable when she finds out Patricia is Burton Collins' daughter.  After the party Elaine resigns her position at the clinic and is packing to leave town when an intruder with a mask kills her.

The police suspect Burton Collins is still alive and he was the shooter when they found Burton's car and gun one block away from the murder scene.  The accusation causes Patricia to begin investigating her father's disappearance nine months earlier when his car went over a bridge.  During her search she discovers her father had a second family and Annie was her half sister.

Cast
 Alison Eastwood as Patricia Collins
 Mark Humphrey as Mac
 Bo Svenson as Philip
 Margot Kidder as Frances
 Iris Quinn as Catherine
 Richy Müller as Bernie

External links
 
 

American television films
English-language Canadian films
2004 television films
2004 films
2004 thriller films
Films based on American novels
Canadian thriller television films
2000s Canadian films